American country music artist Margo Smith has released 18 studio albums, two compilation albums, 37 singles and appeared on three albums. She signed her first recording contract with 20th Century Fox Records in 1975. That year, she had her first major hit with "There I Said It." The song reached the top ten of the Billboard Hot Country Songs chart and was followed by her self-titled album. The label closed its doors and she signed to Warner Bros. Records in 1976. She had several more hits, including the top ten "Take My Breath Away." She released two more albums, including Song Bird (1976), which reached the top 40 of the Billboard Top Country Albums list. In 1978, Smith had her biggest commercial success with the number one hits "Don't Break the Heart That Loves You" and "It Only Hurts for a Little While." The hits were included on a 1977 studio album that reached the top 30.

In 1979, Smith made a shift towards a "sexier image" which altered her musical career. She had two more top ten hits with "Still a Woman" and "If I Give My Heart to You" before reverting to back to a more traditional country image. In 1981, she had a final major hit with "Cup of Tea." The duet with Rex Allen, Jr. reached the country top 20. Smith left Warner Bros. in the early 1980s and continued releasing albums and singles independently. In 1985, she released an album titled The Best of the Tennessee Yodeler, which paid tribute to country singer Bonnie Lou. Her singles continued charting on the Billboard country songs list. Smith had her final chart hit with 1988's "Echo Me." Smith then began recording Christian music with her daughter and signed with Homeland records. In 2005, she released her most current album to date titled Nothing to Lose.

Albums

Studio albums

Compilation albums

Singles

As lead artist

As a featured artist

Other appearances

Notes

References

External links 
 Margo Smith albums and singles at Discogs

Country music discographies
Discographies of American artists